Indios de San Francisco de Macorís is a professional basketball team based in San Francisco de Macorís, Duarte, Dominican Republic. The team currently plays in the Dominican top division Liga Nacional de Baloncesto.

Current roster

Championships
Liga Nacional de Baloncesto  (2× ) 
2013, 2019

References

Basketball teams established in 2005
Basketball teams in the Dominican Republic